Yale: A History is a 1999 book written by Brooks Mather Kelley on the history of Yale University.

References

External links 

 

1999 non-fiction books
English-language books
Books about Yale University
Yale University Press books